Gopi K. Podila (September 14, 1957 – February 12, 2010) was an Indian–American biologist who served as a professor at the University of Alabama in Huntsville. He was one of three faculty members killed in a shooting at the university on February 12, 2010. Podila was chairperson of the university's department of biological sciences, with a particular interest in the ecology of Populus and their mycorrhizal symbionts.

Research career
He listed his research interests as "engineering tree biomass for bioenergy, functional genomics of plant-microbe interactions, plant molecular biology and biotechnology".

In particular, Podila studied genes that regulate growth in fast growing trees, especially poplar and aspen. He has advocated prospective use of fast growing trees and grasses as an alternative to corn sources for producing ethanol. He was also the coordinator of an international consortium of institutions that has deciphered the genome of mycorrhizal fungus, a fungus whose symbiotic properties allow trees to generate large amounts of biomass.

G. K. Podila received a B.Sc. degree from Nagarjuna University in India. He obtained a master's degree from Louisiana State University in 1983 and a PhD in molecular biology from Indiana State University in 1987. Prior to joining the University of Alabama in Huntsville, he worked at Michigan Technological University from 1990 to 2002.

Podila was an Editorial Board member of the journals Symbiosis, New Phytologist, Physiology and Molecular Biology of Plants,  and Journal of Plant Interactions.

At the time of his death Podila was a Councilor of the International Symbiosis Society. He is survived by his widow, Vani Podila, and two daughters.

UAH shooting

On February 12, 2010, Amy Bishop, a faculty member in Podila's department, drew a handgun during a staff meeting and shot six people. Podila and two other faculty members were killed. Bishop was taken into custody outside the building and charged with capital murder. Bishop was convicted and sentenced to life in prison.

Works

References

External links

 (Archive) UAH.
G. K. Podila profile at ScientificCommons.org

1957 births
2010 deaths
Deaths by firearm in Alabama
Indian emigrants to the United States
20th-century Indian biologists
Indiana State University alumni
Louisiana State University alumni
University of Alabama in Huntsville faculty
People murdered in Alabama
Scientists from Andhra Pradesh
American biologists